The 2007 FIBA Europe Under-16 Championship Division B was an international basketball competition held in Macedonia in 2007.

Medalists
1.   Poland

2.   Hungary 

3.   Sweden

Final ranking (comparative)
1.  Montenegro

2.  Sweden

3.  Finland

4.  England

5.  Poland

6.  Bosnia and Herzegovina

7.  Netherlands

8.  Hungary

9.  Germany

10.  Cyprus

11.  Austria

12.  Estonia

13.  Belgium

14.  Norway

15.  Slovakia

16.  Ireland

17.  Belarus

18.  Bulgaria 

19.  Romania

20.  Macedonia

21.  Armenia

External links
FIBA Archive

FIBA U16 European Championship Division B
2007–08 in European basketball
2007–08 in Republic of Macedonia basketball
International youth basketball competitions hosted by North Macedonia